Qianjiang Wulingshan Airport  is an airport serving Qianjiang District of Chongqing municipality, China. The airport was opened on November 22, 2010 with a total investment of 600 million yuan. It has a 2,400-meter runway (class 4C).

Airlines and destinations

See also
List of airports in China
List of the busiest airports in China

References

Airports in Chongqing
Airports established in 2010
2010 establishments in China